There have been several cases of exploding whale carcasses due to a buildup of gas in the decomposition process. This would occur if a whale stranded itself ashore. Actual explosives have also been used to assist in disposing of whale carcasses, ordinarily after towing the carcass out to sea, and as part of a beach cleaning effort. It was reported as early as 1928, when an attempt to preserve a carcass failed due to faulty chemical usages.

A widely reported case of an exploding whale occurred in Florence, Oregon, in November 1970, when the Oregon Highway Division (now the Oregon Department of Transportation) blew up a decaying sperm whale with dynamite in an attempt to dispose of its rotting carcass. American humorist Dave Barry wrote about it in his newspaper column in 1990 after viewing television footage of the explosion, and later the same footage from news station KATU circulated on the Internet. It was also parodied in the 2007 American film Reno 911!: Miami and in the 2018 Australian film Swinging Safari.

An example of a spontaneously bursting whale carcass occurred in Taiwan in 2004, when the buildup of gas inside a decomposing sperm whale caused it to burst in a crowded urban area while it was being transported for a post-mortem examination. Other cases, natural and artificial, have also been reported in Canada, South Africa, Iceland, Australia, Denmark, and the United Kingdom. Artificial explosions have also been imposed by governments, and approved by the International Whaling Commission in emergency situations. However, it has also been criticized for its long-lasting odor.

United States

Event

On November 9, 1970, a  sperm whale washed ashore at Florence on the central Oregon Coast. At the time, Oregon beaches were under the jurisdiction of the state's Highway Division, which, after consulting with the United States Navy, decided to remove the whale using dynamiteassuming that the resulting pieces would be small enough for scavenger animals to consume.

George Thornton, the engineer in charge of the operation, told an interviewer that he was not sure how much dynamite would be needed, saying that he had been chosen to remove the whale because his supervisor had gone hunting.
A military veteran with explosives training who happened to be in the area warned that the planned twenty cases of dynamite was far too much, and that 20 sticks would have sufficed, but his advice went unheeded.

The dynamite was detonated on November 12 at 3:45 pm. The resulting explosion was caught on film by cameraman Doug Brazil for a story reported by news reporter Paul Linnman of KATU-TV in Portland, Oregon. In his voice-over, Linnman joked that "land-lubber newsmen" became "land-blubber newsmen ... for the blast blasted blubber beyond all believable bounds." The explosion caused large pieces of blubber to land near buildings and in parking lots some distance away from the beach. Only some of the whale was disintegrated; most of it remained on the beach for the Oregon Highway Division workers to clear away. In his report, Linnman also noted that scavenger birds, who it had been hoped would eat the remains of the carcass after the explosion, did not appear as they were possibly scared away by the noise.
The explosives-expert veteran's brand-new automobile, purchased during a "Get a Whale of a Deal" promotion in a nearby city, was flattened by a chunk of falling blubber.

Ending his story, Linnman noted that "It might be concluded that, should a whale ever be washed ashore in Lane County again, those in charge will not only remember what to do, they'll certainly remember what not to do." When 41 sperm whales beached nearby in 1979, state parks officials burned and buried them.

Later that day, Thornton told the Eugene Register-Guard, "It went just exactly right. ... Except the blast funneled a hole in the sand under the whale" and that some of the whale chunks were subsequently blown back toward the onlookers and their cars.

Thornton was promoted to the Medford office several months after the incident, and served in that post until his retirement. When Linnman contacted him in the mid-1990s, the newsman said Thornton felt the operation had been an overall success and had been converted into a public-relations disaster by hostile media reports.

Currently, Oregon State Parks Department policy is to bury whale carcasses where they land. If the sand is not deep enough, they are relocated to another beach.

Renewed interest
The story was brought to widespread public attention by writer Dave Barry in his Miami Herald column of May 20, 1990, when he reported that he possessed footage of the event. Barry wrote, "Here at the institute we watch it often, especially at parties." Some time later, the Oregon State Highway division started to receive calls from the media after a shortened version of the article was distributed on bulletin boards under the title "The Far Side Comes to Life in Oregon". The unattributed copy of Barry's article did not explain that the event had happened approximately twenty-five years earlier. Barry later said that, on a fairly regular basis, someone would forward him his own column and suggest he write something about the described incident.
As a result of these omissions, an article in the ODOT's TranScript notes that,

The KATU footage resurfaced later as a video file on several websites, becoming a viral video. A 2006 study found that the video had been viewed 350 million times across various websites. In 2020, residents of Florence voted to name a new recreational area "Exploding Whale Memorial Park" in honor of the incident; it also has a memorial plaque. For the 50th anniversary of the event, KATU pulled the original 16 mm footage from the archives and released a remastered edition of the news report in 4K resolution. Commemorating the anniversary as well, locals were reported to visit the beach and dress as whales.

Taiwan
Another whale explosion occurred on January 29, 2004, in Tainan City, Taiwan. This time the explosion resulted from the buildup of gas inside a decomposing sperm whale, which caused it to burst. The cause of the phenomenon was initially unknown, since it occurred in the spinal area of the whale, not in its abdomen as might be expected. It was later determined that the whale had most likely been struck by a large shipping vessel, damaging its spine and weakening the area, and leading to its death. The whale died after beaching on the southwestern coast of Taiwan, and it took three large cranes and 50 workers more than 13 hours to shift the whale onto the back of a truck.

Taiwan News reported that, while the whale was being moved, "... a large crowd of more than 600 local Yunlin residents and curiosity seekers, along with vendors selling snack food and hot drinks, braved the cold temperature and chilly wind to watch workmen try to haul away the dead marine leviathan".
Professor Wang Chien-ping had ordered the whale be moved to the Sutsao Wild Life Reservation Area after he had been refused permission to perform a necropsy at the National Cheng Kung University in Tainan. When it burst, the whale carcass was on the back of a truck near the center of Tainan, en route from the university laboratory to the preserve. The bursting whale splattered blood and entrails over surrounding shop fronts, bystanders, and cars.
The explosion did not, however, cause injuries or prevent researchers from performing a necropsy on the animal.

Over the course of about a year, Wang completed a bone display from the remains of the whale. The assembled specimen and some preserved organs and tissues have been on display in the Taijiang Cetacean Museum since April 8, 2005.

Others

 In 1928, entrepreneurs Harold L. Anfenger and M. C. Hutton accidentally exploded a whale carcass they were attempting to preserve for a sideshow when the embalmer they had hired badly misjudged the balance of salt and formaldehyde necessary to preserve the specimen.
A dead whale washed ashore just yards from Moby's Pub in Ganges Harbour on Salt Spring Island, British Columbia, Canada, in January of 2011. Author David Spalding claimed in a book that it exploded, and that its blubber "hung in the trees for weeks".
 Whale corpses are regularly disposed of using explosives; however, the whales are usually first towed out to sea. Government-sanctioned explosions have occurred in South Africa, Iceland, and Australia.
 A number of controlled explosions have been made in South Africa. In the latter instance, the authorities stated that the whale could not have been saved, and that the use of explosives in such cases was recommended by the International Whaling Commission. A few weeks after the Port Elizabeth explosion, the carcass of a second humpback was dragged out to sea and explosives were used to break it into pieces so it would not pose a hazard to shipping. Yet another explosion was performed in Bonza Bay on September 20, 2004, when an adult humpback whale died after beaching itself. In order to sink the whale, authorities towed it out to sea, affixed explosives to it, and set them off from a distance.
A whale carcass adrift in the Icelandic harbour of Hafnarfjörður was split in two by a controlled explosion on June 5, 2005. The remains were dragged out to sea; however, they soon drifted back, and eventually had to be tied down.
 On September 2, 2010, a  humpback whale that had been stranded for two weeks near the Western Australian city of Albany was killed by the Department of Environment and Conservation using explosives. The department had planned to let the whale die of natural causes, but decided to kill the animal with explosives after it repositioned itself on a sandbar.
 A sperm whale carcass burst in Við Áir, Faroe Islands on November 26, 2013, when measures were taken to avoid a larger burst by perforating its skin. Footage of the incident was shown on Kringvarp Føroya, the national Faroese broadcaster.
 In April 2014, officials in Trout River, Newfoundland and Labrador, Canada, expressed concern that the carcass of a blue whale which had washed ashore might burst, as it had expanded to twice its normal size from trapped gas.
 One of three sperm whales that died after becoming beached on the Lincolnshire coast near Skegness, United Kingdom in January 2016 burst due to a build-up of gases in the carcass, after a marine biologist cut into it while trying to perform a post-mortem. The bursting caused a "huge blast of air".

See also
 Globster
 Tay Whale

References

Further reading

External links

 Exploding Whale news piece by Paul Linnman  (WMV) from KATU 2
 Exploding Whale news piece by Paul Linnman (multiple versions using QuickTime) from TheExplodingWhale.com
 Taipei Times image of an exploded whale 
 
 Taiwan's exploding whale incident on National Geographic
 Offbeat Oregon History article: "The truth about the legendary exploding whale of Florence, Oregon"
 Florence Whale Explosion, The Oregon Encyclopedia
 The Simpsons Season 21, Episode 20. 

News
 
 
 

Whales
Whale
1970 in Oregon
Internet memes
Oregon Coast